Deimos-1 is a Spanish Earth imaging satellite which is operated by Deimos Imaging who commercializes its imagery directly but also has distribution agreements with other entities like Astrium GEO and DMC International Imaging.

History
It was constructed by Surrey Satellite Technology for Elecnor Deimos, representing the first Spanish Earth observation satellite and the first private one in Europe. It is based on the SSTL-100 satellite bus. Deimos-1 was launched into a  sun-synchronous low Earth orbit. The launch was conducted by ISC Kosmotras, who used a Dnepr carrier rocket, with DubaiSat-1 as the primary payload. Deimos-1, along with the UK-DMC 2, Nanosat 1B, AprizeSat-3 and AprizeSat-4 satellites, were launched as secondary payloads. The rocket was launched at 18:46 GMT on 29 July 2009, from Site 109/95 at the Baikonur Cosmodrome in Kazakhstan.

The satellite was purchased from Elecnor Deimos by Urthecast in 2015, together with Deimos-2 and Deimos Imaging, the division of the Spanish company that was in charge of the operation of both satellites.

Optical instrument
The satellite has an expected lifetime of five years.

Advantages 
These optical satellite images open new perspectives to users of this satellite for the development of services & applications in various markets such as Maritime, Agriculture, Environment or Forestry.
 Fast coverage of territories thanks to its wide swath 
 Near-real-time capacity
 Competitive price

See also

2009 in spaceflight

References

External links 
 Astrium-Geo
 Deimos-Imaging 

Earth imaging satellites
Spacecraft launched in 2009
Satellites of Spain
Spacecraft launched by Dnepr rockets